Zora the Vampire is a 2000 Italian horror-comedy film written and directed by Manetti Bros. It is loosely based on the eponymous comic character.

Plot

Cast  
Micaela Ramazzotti: Zora
Toni Bertorelli: Dracula
Raffaele Vannoli: Servant of Dracula
Carlo Verdone: Police commissioner Lombardi
Ivo Garrani: The Priest
Chef Ragoo: Zombi
Selen: Vampira
G Max: Lama
Tormento: Cianuro
Valerio Mastandrea: Nicola Speranza 
Sandro Ghiani: Cuccureddu

See also
Films about immigration to Italy

References

External links

2000 films
2000 comedy horror films
Italian comedy horror films
Italian vampire films
Dracula films
Vampire comedy films
Films based on Italian comics
Films directed by the Manetti Bros.
Live-action films based on comics
2000 comedy films
2000s Italian films